The México 1970 Segunda División was the 21st season of the Mexican Segunda División. The season started on 5 March 1970 and concluded on 11 October 1970. It was won by Unión de Curtidores. It was a special tournament held as part of the celebrations of the 1970 FIFA World Cup, which was hosted by Mexico.

The Mexican Football Federation held a tournament in two phases, before the world cup (Mar. 5 - May 10) and after the world cup (July 11 - Oct. 10).

Seventeen teams were seeded in three groups of five or six teams: North, Central and West, first three or two places of each group advanced to the "Championship Group" and the last two or three teams of each group played in a "Consolation Group".

Changes 
 Celaya was dissolved at the end of 1969–70 season.
 Poza Rica was dissolved between first and second phase of the México 1970 season.
 U. de N.L. was renamed as UANL.

Teams

First stage

Central Group

West Group

North Group

Second stage

Championship Group

Consolation Group

Primera División promotion playoff 
For the 1970–71 season, the Mexican Football Federation decided to expand the Primera División from 16 to 18 teams, for that reason a promotion playoff was played between the first four teams classified in the Segunda Division Championship Group. The series was held at the Estadio Olímpico Universitario, Mexico City between November 6 and 12, 1970. Puebla was the winner.

Segunda División – Tercera División playoff 
Due to the expansion of the Primera Division, and the dissolution of various clubs in the Segunda Division. The Mexican Football Federation decided to hold a promotional playoff between teams from the Segunda and Tercera Division. These series were held at the Estadio Plan de San Luis, San Luis Potosí City, between December 15 and 18, 1970.

This round was developed in the direct elimination format, that is, the winning teams in the first matches won promotion or permanence in the category. The same thing happens in the second round, until reaching a final match between the two worst teams. This phase was played by Celaya and Tampico, from the Segunda División; along with Atlético Cuernavaca, Cuautla, Querétaro and Universidad Veracruzana, from the Tercera División.

First stage

Second stage

Final stage

References 

1969–70 in Mexican football
1970–71 in Mexican football
Segunda División de México seasons